Cold Brook is a stream in Lewis County, New York, United States, that flows into the Black River near Port Leyden, New York. It has a drainage area of 4.80 square miles, and is designated by the United States Geological Survey as "Hydrologic Unit 04150101".

References 

Rivers of New York (state)